Crassibougia is a genus of sea snails, marine gastropod mollusks in the family Fasciolariidae, the spindle snails, the tulip snails and their allies.

Species
Species within the genus Crassibougia include:
 Crassibougia clausicaudata (Hinds, 1844)
 Crassibougia hediae Stahlschmidt & Fraussen, 2012

References

 Stahlschmidt P. & Fraussen K. (2012) Crassibougia, a new genus for Fusus clausicaudatus Hinds, 1844, from South Africa, with description of a new species (Gastropoda: Fasciolariidae). Miscellanea Malacologica 5(5): 85-93

Fasciolariidae